Voice + Whisper is the debut mini-album by South Korean vocal group Voisper. It was released on November 18, 2016, by Evermore Music and distributed by LOEN Entertainment. A string of singles—"In Your Voice", "Summer Cold", and "Heart"—preceded its release. Voice + Whisper and the lead track "Learn to Love" were simultaneously released. Voisper promoted the record through music chart programs across various television networks. The mini-album peaked at number 61 on South Korea's national Gaon Album Chart.

Background
Recording and mixing for Voice + Whisper took place in Seoul at Evermore Studios, except "On & On" which was mixed in Los Angeles at Earthtones Studios. The record was mastered at Sterling Sound in New York City.

Music structure
Voice + Whisper opens with "On & On", a dance number which incorporates modern rock and electronic music into its sound. "Learn to Love" is an "emotional" ballad which conveys the sorrow upon the separation of two lovers. "Heart" is an R&B song with a "dramatic" composition; compromising a "sentimental" piano, the track progresses with an "intense" drum beat and synthesizer. It serves as the narrator's monologue upon separating from his partner. "Summer Cold" incorporates acoustic guitar and piano over an orchestra. The song is about a "terrible" breakup and the feeling that follows, which is compared to having a cold on a hot day. "In Your Voice" is an R&B ballad which consists of a "dreamlike" melody coupled by a "sweet" piano and "powerful" drums. It is a medium-tempo track in which the lyrics tell the "romance of first love".

Release and promotion

Prior its digital distribution, Voisper performed "In Your Voice" beginning on February 23 on SBS MTV's music program The Show, MBC Music's Show Champion, MBC's Show! Music Core, and SBS's Inkigayo. A music video teaser for the song was uploaded on February 26, with the full version being released on March 2. The group continued to promote the song on Mnet's M Countdown and KBS2's Music Bank. Voisper also performed "In Your Voice" for the video platform JuseTV. The quartet sang the song while appearing on KBS Cool FM's Yoo Ji-won's Rooftop Radio, SBS Power FM's Cultwo Show, and MBC FM4U's Kim Shin-young's Hope Song at Noon. Voisper also made a guest appearance on labelmate Jung Dong-ha's Dream concert in Seongnam, where they performed "In Your Voice".

On June 8, 2016, an image teaser was publicized for Voisper's upcoming release. A music video teaser for "Summer Cold" followed one week later; the full version was uploaded on June 17, where actors Jeon Yeo-been and Jang Woo-young play the onscreen couple. A promotional poster for the song showcasing Jeon was posted throughout Seoul, including in Daehangno, Hongdae, Sinchon, Nowon, and Konkuk University. Voisper sang "Summer Cold" for the video platform JuseTV. Voisper promoted "Summer Cold" by performing the single on SBS MTV's The Show and MBC Music's Show Champion. The group also performed the song on the Floating Stage in Yeouido.

A photo teaser signaling the release of "Heart" was published on October 4. Released two days later, the track marked the pre-release for Voisper + Whisper and Voisper's third single. Voisper also performed "Heart" for the video platform JuseTV.

Promotion for Voice + Whisper was initiated on November 9 with the release of teaser photos for each member. On November 11, four music video stills were published, followed by a video teaser five days later. The mini-album and lead single "Learn to Love" were concurrently released on November 18. Later that day, Voisper held an album showcase at the Ilchi Art Hall in the Gangnam District of Seoul.

Critical reception
Kim Seong-dae of MyDaily complimented Voisper's vocals, noting the group's "sweet" harmonies since its debut single "In Your Voice". Writing for TV Daily, Kim Ji-ha lauded the members' individual vocals as well as their harmony as a group. Kim Han-gil echoed the sentiment, expressing that the record "boasts perfect harmonies".

Commercial performance
On the chart dated November 20 – 26, 2016, Voice + Whisper debuted at number 61 on South Korea's national Gaon Album Chart.

Track listing

Credits
Credits adapted from the mini-album's liner notes.

 1sagain – lyricist
 Amy J – intro narration ("In Your Voice")
 Arania – printing
 Baek Hyeon-su – arranger, composer
 Choi Ga-ram – arranger
 Choi Hun – bass
 Choi Jin-a – stylist
 Choi Ji-hun – project supervisor
 Claudio Cueni – mixing engineer
 Dae-yeong at Style Floor – make-up
 Dan-bi at Style Floor – hair
 Donnie J – arranger, chorus arrangement, composer, piano, synthesizer
 Gi Hyeon-seok – arranger, composer
 Hong Yong-cheol – co-producer, mixing engineer, recording engineer
 Hwang Hyeon-jo – administration
 Im Seok-jin at Zany Bros – music video director
 Jang Ji-won – piano
 joon6 – arranger, composer, piano
 Jung Sang-hyeon – drums
 Kang Han – chorus arrangement, lyricist
 Kim Hyeon-cheol – management
 Kim Ik-gyeom – promotion
 Kim Ji-hu – arranger, composer
 Kim Jong-gak – project supervisor

 Kim Kang-san – composer, lyricist
 Kim Seong-dae – management
 Kwon Da-som – A&R
 Kwon Gi-wook – producer
 Joe LaPorta – mastering engineer
 lllayer – design
 Lee Geun-hyeon – guitar
 Lee Dal-won – executive producer
 Lee Hun-gu – photography
 Lee Jae-min – project planning
 Lee Seong-ryeol – guitar
 Lee Woo-hyeon – assistant engineer
 Park Dong-il – composer, arranger, piano
 Park Go-eun – marketing
 Park Sang-hyeop – assistant engineer
 Park Sun-cheol – bass
 Ryu Jeong-su – management
 Seon-hee at Style Floor – hair
 Shin Min – strings arrangement
 Shin Seok-cheol – drums
 Song Jin-seok – arranger, composer, strings arrangement
 Yoon Sa-ra – lyricist
 Yoong String – strings

Charts

References

2016 debut EPs
Contemporary R&B EPs
Voisper EPs